Winbush is a surname of English origin. People with that surname include:

 Angela Winbush (born 1955), American R&B/soul singer-songwriter
 Angela Winbush (album), the third studio album by Angela Winbush
 Anthony Winbush (born 1994), American football player
 Camille Winbush (born 1990), American television actress, comedian and recording artist
 Nelson W. Winbush (born 1929), African-American educator
 Raymond Winbush (born 1948), American-African scholar
 Troy Winbush (born 1970), American actor

See also 
 Wimbush (disambiguation)